Amy Talei Bonté (born 20 November 1990) is an American rugby union player. She made her international debut for the United States against New Zealand in July 2015.

In 2021, Bonté featured for the Eagles against Canada in the second match of the Pacific Four Series. She was named in the Eagles squad for their November test series.

Bonté was called into the Eagles squad for the 2022 Pacific Four Series in New Zealand.

References

External links 

 Eagles Profile

Living people
1990 births
Female rugby union players
American female rugby union players
United States women's international rugby union players